Leiestinae is a subfamily of handsome fungus beetles in the family Endomychidae. There are at least three genera and about five described species in Leiestinae.

Genera
These three genera belong to the subfamily Leiestinae:
 Phymaphora Newman, 1838
 Rhanidea Strohecker, 1953
 Stethorhanis Blaisdell, 1931

References

Further reading

 
 
 
 
 
 

Endomychidae
Articles created by Qbugbot